Maria de Alvear (born 1960 in Madrid, Spain) is a Spanish-German composer living in Germany who was born to a Spanish father and German mother. She studied with Mauricio Kagel at the Hochschule für Musik und Tanz Köln, completing a course in new music theatre in 1986.

References

New York Times review by Bernard Holland of Maria de Alvear's World (May 17, 1997), accessed 8 February 2010

External links 
 Maria de Alvear's web site
      Maria de Alvear's CDs
  Maria del Alvear on Kalvos.org

1960 births
20th-century classical composers
21st-century classical composers
German classical composers
German women composers
Living people
Spanish women classical composers
Spanish people of German descent
Women classical composers
20th-century German composers
20th-century Spanish musicians
21st-century German composers
20th-century women composers
21st-century women composers
20th-century German women
20th-century Spanish women
21st-century German women